Sky Diver is an arcade video game designed by Owen Rubin, and released by Atari, Inc. in 1978. An Atari VCS port by Jim Huether was published in 1979. The game is a third-person view of a parachuting drop zone. Sky Diver is a two-player game, although one player can play.

Gameplay

The object of Sky Diver is to jump out of a plane, release a parachute and land on the landing pad. To get higher points, the player must release the parachute closer to the ground. The player has nine jumps. If the landing pad is missed, the player loses points. The highest score possible is 99 points (11 points maximum per jump).

Legacy
Sky Diver has been re-released as part of compilations such as Atari Anthology. In July 2010, the game was included on Microsoft's Game Room service.

A remake of the game has been announced for release exclusively for the Intellivision Amico.

References

External links
 Sky Diver at KLOV
 Sky Diver at AtariAge
 Owen Rubin's (the creator's) home page. See "Game Stories" link for more info

1978 video games
Action video games
Arcade video games
Atari 2600 games
Parachuting video games
Multiplayer and single-player video games
Video games developed in the United States